Fama El Foukki is a Moroccan former footballer. She has captained the Morocco women's national team.

Club career
El Foukki has played for Filles du Boughaz in Morocco.

International career
El Foukki capped for Morocco at senior level during the 2000 African Women's Championship.

See also
 List of Morocco women's international footballers

References

External links

Living people
Moroccan women's footballers
Morocco women's international footballers
Year of birth missing (living people)
Women's association footballers not categorized by position